Urbain Roger Batoum ( Roger; born 19 December 1978 in Cameroon) is a Cameroonian footballer.

Honours

Club 

 With Happy Valley
 Hong Kong Senior Shield: 2003–04
 Hong Kong FA Cup: 2003–04

References

External links 
 Roger Batoum at HKFA
 Profile at convoysunhei.hk 

1978 births
Living people
Cameroonian footballers
Association football forwards
FC Unirea Urziceni players
Happy Valley AA players
Hong Kong Rangers FC players
Sun Hei SC players
Hong Kong First Division League players
Expatriate footballers in Hong Kong
Expatriate footballers in Romania
Liga I players
Persija Jakarta players
Persikabo Bogor players
Persebaya Surabaya players
PSCS Cilacap players
Indonesian Premier Division players
Cameroonian expatriate sportspeople in Indonesia
Expatriate footballers in Indonesia
Cameroonian expatriate sportspeople in Romania
Cameroonian expatriate sportspeople in Hong Kong
Cameroonian expatriate sportspeople in Gabon
Expatriate footballers in Gabon
US Bitam players